Roncofreddo ( or ) is a town and comune (municipality) in the Province of Forlì-Cesena in the Italian region Emilia-Romagna, located about  southeast of Bologna and about  southeast of Forlì.

References

External links
 Official website

Cities and towns in Emilia-Romagna